Michael Tolaydo (born 23 July 1946), also as Michael Ellis-Tolaydo, is a Kenyan actor particularly active in American theater.

Career
He was born on 23 July 1946 in Nairobi, Kenya. He started his acting career in theater productions. In his first theater play, he played as one of the policemen in a school production of Arsenic and Old Lace. Then he has been part of several of Motti Lerner’s plays directed by Sinai Peter. He permanently moved to DC from NYC in the early 1980s.

He has been nominated for a supporting actor Helen Hayes Award and later received one for ensemble acting. His most notable theater plays include" Equus, The Night Alive, Tribes, Privates on Parade, and Blue Heart. He also acted in the plays, The Admission, Apples from the Desert and New Jerusalem. He was again nominated for the Helen Hayes Award for supporting actor for his role in New Jerusalem. In later years, he continued to dominate in the theater with the plays, The Accident, Benedictus, and The Pangs of the Messiah, Heroes in which he won Helen Hayes Award for Ensemble Acting.

Apart from acting, he is also a Professor Emeritus of Theater, Film, and Media Studies at St. Mary’s College of Maryland. After 29 years of teaching career, he retired in May 2016.

Filmography

References

External links
 
 Tag: Michael Tolaydo
 Michael Tolaydo: Boged Hits its Mark

Living people
Kenyan male stage actors
American male stage actors
Kenyan male film actors
American male film actors
1946 births
Kenyan male television actors
American male telenovela actors
Kenyan emigrants to the United States
20th-century Kenyan male actors
21st-century Kenyan male actors